Matthew Dodds (born 29 August 1989) is an Australian figure skater who completes in pair skating and men's singles. As a pair skater with partner Paris Stephens, he is the 2013 Skate Down Under champion, the 2016 Volvo Open Cup silver medalist, and a four-time Australian national champion (2013-2015, 2017).

With former partner Emma Greensill, he is the 2012 Australian national champion, and the 2011 Australian junior national silver medalist.

Competitive highlights

Pairs with Stephens

Pairs with Greensill

Singles

References 

Living people
1989 births
Australian male pair skaters
Figure skaters at the 2017 Asian Winter Games